Inner Mongolia University for the Nationalities ( Öbür mongγol-un ündüsüten-ü yeke surγaγuli, 内蒙古民族大学, IMUN) is in Tongliao, Inner Mongolia, China, under the direct administration of the Chinese Government's Inner Mongolia Autonomous Region. IMUN is accredited by the Chinese government and recognized by the World Health Organization (WHO) and World Federation for Medical Education.

IMUN is renowned throughout China as a flagship ethnic minority university, with a focus on the Mongol Chinese ethnic minority group.

History
Founded in 1958, the university merged with two other higher education institutions in 2000 to form a comprehensive university.

Academics
IMUN consists of 22 departments and one teaching and research unit. The colleges include Humanities; Politics, Law and History; Educational Sciences; International Exchange; Mathematics and Computers; Physics and Electromechanics; Chemistry; Mongolian Medicine; Clinical Medicine; Agriculture; Veterinarian Sciences; Mongolian; Physical Sports; Foreign Languages; Arts; Adult Education; Life Sciences; Mechanical Engineering; Economics Management; and Vocational Technology. There are two hospitals attached to IMUN.
Departments
Department of Basic and Clinical 1-Medicine (M.B.B.S)
2-Department of Oral Medicine (B.D.S)
3-Department of Medicine
4-Department of Nursing
Its scientific research unit consists of 11 institutes: World History, Horqin Culture, Condensed State Physics, Computational Physics, Arable Farming, Seeds, and Mongolian Medicine.

The main library is adjacent to the Museum of the Inner Mongolia University of the Nationalities. A beautiful statue of four horses, a symbol of Mongolian culture and history, is prominent in front of these two buildings.

External links
 Official website
 Mongolian introduction
 English introduction
 Chinese introduction
 Unofficial website

 
Universities and colleges in Inner Mongolia
Minzu Universities